Aura Urziceanu (born Bucharest, 14 December 1946), also known as Aura, is a Romanian female pop star who was famous in the 1970s and 1980s. In America she had performed as Urziceanu-Rully and Aura Rully.

She has toured and performed with artists such as Bill Evans, Duke Ellington, Ella Fitzgerald, Ahmad Jamal, Hank Jones, Thad Jones, Dizzy Gillespie, Quincy Jones, Paul Desmond, Joe Pass and Mel Lewis.

References

1946 births
Living people
Romanian jazz musicians
20th-century Romanian women singers
20th-century Romanian singers
Musicians from Bucharest